The ZooQuarium was a small  zoo and aquarium that opened in 1969 on Cape Cod in Yarmouth, Massachusetts, United States. During its operation, it hosted sea lions, seals and other forms of aquatic and land animals. The ZooQuarium formally closed its doors in December 2013.

The property was purchased in 2016 by underwater explorer Barry Clifford for the new  Whydah Pirate Museum II which now houses the exhibit previously presented in National Geographic's REAL PIRATES traveling exhibition featuring artifacts and treasures of the Whydah Gally, the only fully authenticated Golden Age pirate ship wreck on earth.

References

External links
Archived official website

1969 establishments in Massachusetts
2013 disestablishments in Massachusetts
Buildings and structures in Barnstable County, Massachusetts
Former zoos
Defunct aquaria
Parks in Barnstable County, Massachusetts
Zoos disestablished in 2013
Zoos established in 1969
Zoos in Massachusetts